Muse is the third studio album by Grace Jones, released on September 4, 1979, by Island Records.

Production and release
Muse was the last album of Jones's disco trilogy recorded with producer Tom Moulton, which began in 1977 with debut Portfolio. As in the case of two previous records, the first side of the album is a continuous medley of four songs, joined by a narrative about someone who has sinned. The second side, however, consists of disco songs with no lyrical relation to one another. All album art, including the cover image, is by Richard Bernstein.

The album features a re-recorded version "I'll Find My Way to You", which Jones released three years prior to Muse. It was originally featured in a 1976 Italian movie Quelli della calibro 38 (international title: Colt 38 Special Squad) in which she played a club singer. The original version along with a song called "Again and Again" were included on a single produced by composer Stelvio Cipriani. Icelandic keyboardist Thor Baldursson who arranged most of the album and also sang duet with Grace on the track "Suffer" had previously worked in Munich, Germany with disco stars such as Silver Convention, Boney M., Donna Summer, Amanda Lear, and Giorgio Moroder.

Muse was released in the year of the "anti-disco backlash" and both the album and its sole single, "On Your Knees", were largely overlooked by the record buying public at the time and is generally believed to be Grace Jones' "lost album". Muse remains her lowest-charting studio album in the USA and the only studio album not to produce any charting single. For many years, Muse had been the only Grace Jones studio album not to have been re-released on CD. Gold Legion, a record company that specializes in re-issuing classic disco albums on CD, finally released it on the format in November 2011, remastered, but with no bonus tracks. It was first released on CD in the UK in 2015, along with Portfolio and Fame, as part of the Disco boxed set of Jones' first three "disco" era albums.

Track listing
Note: Tracks from side A are a non-stop medley, with the total playing time 20:26.

Personnel

 Thor Baldursson – guest vocals, keyboards, arrangements
 Carla Benson – background vocals
 Keith Benson – drums
 Evette Benton – background vocals
 Richard Bernstein – artwork design
 Eve Boman – photography
 Carl Davis – arrangements
 Carl Helm – background vocals
 Phil Hurt – background vocals
 Barbara Ingram – background vocals
 Grace Jones – lead vocals
 Francis Jug – artwork design
 Tom Moulton – production
 Don Renaldo – strings, horns
 José Rodriguez – mastering
 Craig Snyder – guitar
 Arthur Stoppe – mixing
 Sweethearts of Sigma – background vocals
 Neil Terk – art direction
 Ron Tyson – background vocals
 Jim Walker – percussion
 Larry Washington – percussion
 Jimmy Williams – bass guitar

Singles
The original version of "I'll Find My Way to You" was released on a single with "Again and Again" as the B-side in 1976 and promoted an Italian movie Quelli della calibro 38 (Colt 38 Special Squad). The song did not chart.

The first, and internationally the only single promoting Muse, was "On Your Knees", released shortly before album's premiere. The single was not a commercial success and did not chart. Its B-side was "Don't Mess with the Messer". Some German 7" feature the alternate title "Sugar and Spice" for "Don't Mess with the Messer".

Charts

Release history

References

External links
 Muse on Allmusic
 Muse on Discogs
 Muse on Rate Your Music

1979 albums
Grace Jones albums
Albums produced by Tom Moulton
Albums recorded at Sigma Sound Studios
Island Records albums